Nero (37–68) was emperor of the Roman Empire from 54 to 68.

Nero may also refer to:

People
Any male member of the Claudii Nerones family of gens Claudia may be called Nero to distinguish them from other clan members
Nero Julius Caesar (6–31 AD), related to some emperors
Gaius Claudius Nero, Roman consul and hero of the Battle of the Metaurus in 207 BC
Nero Hawley (1742–1817), freed slave and soldier in the Continental Army
Franco Nero (born 1941), Italian actor
Peter Nero (born 1934), American pianist and composer
Nero Bellum, lead singer of the musical group Psyclon Nine
Ranjith Premasiri Madalana (died 2009), alias Nero, decorated Sri Lanka Army sniper

Places
Nero, Kentucky, United States
Nero, Mozambique
Nero, West Virginia, United States
Nero Island, an uninhabited island in Qikiqtaaluk Region, Nunavut, Canada
Lake Nero, in Yaroslavl Oblast, Russia
Nero, the German name for Nerău village, Teremia Mare Commune, Timiș County, Romania

Art, entertainment, and media

Comics
The Adventures of Nero, a Belgian comics series
Nero and Zero, a British comic strip

Characters
Nero (comic book character), the protagonist in the Flemish comic book character The Adventures of Nero
Nero (DC Comics), a supervillain opponent of the Green Lantern
Nero (Devil May Cry), a character in the video game series Devil May Cry
Nero Wolfe, a fictional detective
A character in the British 1930s comic strip Nero and Zero
Barone Nero, a character from Ressha Sentai ToQger
Angelica Nero, character in season 9 of Dallas (1978 TV series)
Nero, character in Boktai 2: Solar Boy Django
Nero, character from the manga and anime One Piece
Nero, character in British children's series 4 O'Clock Club 
Nero the Sable, member of the fictional Tsviets of Deepground in Dirge of Cerberus: Final Fantasy VII
Nero, minor villain in the British cartoon series Danger Mouse
Nero, a Servant of the Saber class in Fate/Extra and Fate/Extella video games
Nero, a character in Derek Landy's book Bedlam, book 12 in the Skulduggery Pleasant series
Nero, a character from the 2009 Star Trek film
Nero Padilla, a character on Sons of Anarchy 
Vice Principal Nero, a character from Lemony Snicket's A Series of Unfortunate Events

Film
Nero-Film, a German film production company of the Weimar era
Nero (1909 film), an Italian film directed by Luigi Maggi and Arturo Ambrosio 
Nero (1922 film), an American-Italian historical film directed by J. Gordon Edwards
Nero (1992 film), an Italian crime comedy film written and directed by Giancarlo Soldi
Nero (2004 film), a television film

Games
New England Role-playing Organization, a live action role-playing game
National Emergency Response Organization, a fictional institution in the game Days Gone

Music
Nero (band), an electronic music trio composed of Daniel Stephens, Joe Ray, and Alana Watson
, a 1705 opera by George Frideric Handel, HWV 2
Nero (opera), an 1879 grand opera by Anton Rubinstein to a libretto by Jules Barbier
Nero (Closterkeller album), 2003
Nero (Two Steps from Hell album), or the title song
"Nero", a 1981 single by post-punk band Theatre of Hate
"Nero the Second", an Anglo-Irish Jacobite song of the 18th century
"Black Cat" (aka Nero), a song by the South Korean group Turbo

Software
Nero AG, German software company (formerly known as Ahead Software), and its products:
Nero Burning ROM, CD/DVD authoring application
Nero Digital, suite of MPEG-4-compatible audio and video compression codecs
Nero Multimedia Suite, a suite of CD/DVD authoring tools and digital entertainment products that includes Nero Burning ROM, among other software
Neuro-Evolving Robotic Operatives, a video game in which soldiers are evolved with the neuroevolution of augmenting topologies algorithm

Other uses
Nero (confectionery), a Norwegian liquorice-based dark chocolate confection
Nero (yacht), one of the world's largest luxury yachts
Nero d'Avola, Sicilian red wine grape variety
Nero Decree, a 1945 decree of Adolf Hitler
Caffè Nero, a chain of coffee houses

See also
Niro (disambiguation)
Neron (disambiguation)
Nerone (disambiguation)
Nervo (disambiguation)